Leon Raeminton Jarvis (born February 2, 1949) is a retired American football wide receiver.  He played professionally in the National Football League (NFL) for the Atlanta Falcons, Buffalo Bills, Detroit Lions, and the New England Patriots.  Jarvis played college football at Norfolk State University. He is now living in Wisconsin with his wife, Ahdea, and daughter, Rahdea.

References

1949 births
Living people
American football wide receivers
Atlanta Falcons players
Buffalo Bills players
Detroit Lions players
New England Patriots players
Norfolk State Spartans football players
Sportspeople from Chesapeake, Virginia
Players of American football from Virginia
African-American players of American football
21st-century African-American people
20th-century African-American sportspeople